The 1983–84 Saudi Premier League was the 8th season of Saudi Premier League since its establishment in 1976. Al-Ettifaq were the defending champions, having won their 1st title in the previous season. The campaign began on 5 October 1983 and ended on 17 February 1984. The league was contested by 10 teams the top 8 teams from the previous season as well as Al-Wehda and Al-Riyadh, who joined as the promoted clubs from the 1982–83 First Division.

Going into the final matchday, Al-Ahli were leading the table with 2 points ahead of derby rivals Al-Ittihad. Al-Ittihad would face fourth-placed Al-Qadisiyah at home while Al-Ahli would face ninth-placed Al-Nahda away from home. Al-Ittihad would play on 9 February while Al-Ahli were originally scheduled to play on 10 February. However, Al-Ahli's match was delayed to 17 February. Al-Ahli won the League title on 9 February 1984 after Al-Ittihad drew Al-Qadisiyah 1–1 at home. Telê Santana became the fifth Brazilian to win the Saudi Premier League after Didi, Mário Zagallo, Chico Formiga, and Chinesinho.

No relegation would happen this season following the decision to expand the league to 12 teams.

This season was notable for the absence of Saudi internationals. This was due to the Saudi national team's participation in the qualifiers for the 1984 Summer Olympics. These players include Al-Nassr's Majed Abdullah, Al-Ahli's Mohamed Abd Al-Jawad, Al-Hilal's Saleh Nu'eimeh, Al-Ettifaq's Saleh Khalifa, Al-Ittihad's Ahmed Bayazid, and Al-Shabab's Khalid Al-Ma'ajil among others.

Teams
Ten teams competed in the league – the top eight teams of the previous season and the two promoted teams from the First Division. Al-Wehda and Al-Riyadh were promoted to the Premier League and returned to the top flight after an absence of one year. Al-Wehda were promoted on 24 March 1983 after defeating Al-Taawoun 2–0 at home. Al-Wehda clinched the title after drawing Al-Riyadh 0–0 in the final matchday. Al-Riyadh were promoted after drawing Al-Wehda 0–0 in the final matchday.

Ohod were the first team to be relegated following a 5–1 away defeat to Al-Shabab on 7 April 1983. The following day, Al-Rawdhah were defeated by Al-Qadisiyah 2–0 and were relegated.

Stadiums and locations

League table

Promoted: Ohod, Al-Jabalain.

Results

Season statistics

Top scorers

See also
 1984 King Cup 
 1985–86 Asian Club Championship
 1985 Arab Club Champions Cup

References

External links 
 RSSSF Stats
 Article writer for Saleh Al-Hoireny - Al-Jazirah newspaper 03-09-2010

Saudi Premier League seasons
Premier League
Saudi Premier League